The following highways are numbered 89:

Canada
 Manitoba Highway 89
 Highway 89 (Ontario)

Israel
Highway 89 (Israel)

United States
 Interstate 89
 Interstate 87 (North Carolina–Virginia) (former proposal)
 U.S. Route 89
 Alabama State Route 89
 Arizona State Route 89
 Arizona State Route 89L (former)
 Arkansas Highway 89
 California State Route 89
 Colorado State Highway 89
 Connecticut Route 89
 Florida State Road 89
 County Road 89 (Santa Rosa County, Florida)
 Georgia State Route 89
 Illinois Route 89
 Illinois Route 89B (former)
 Illinois Route 89C (former)
 Iowa Highway 89 (former)
 K-89 (Kansas highway)
 Kentucky Route 89
 Louisiana Highway 89
 Maine State Route 89
 Maryland Route 89 (former)
 M-89 (Michigan highway)
 Minnesota State Highway 89
 County Road 89 (Ramsey County, Minnesota)
 Missouri Route 89
 Montana Highway 89
 Nebraska Highway 89
 Nebraska Recreation Road 89B
 Nevada State Route 89 (former)
 County Route 89 (Bergen County, New Jersey)
 New Mexico State Road 89
 New York State Route 89
 County Route 89 (Cattaraugus County, New York)
 County Route 89 (Cayuga County, New York)
 County Route 89 (Chautauqua County, New York)
 County Route 89 (Dutchess County, New York)
 County Route 89 (Montgomery County, New York)
 County Route 89 (Oneida County, New York)
 County Route 89 (Orange County, New York)
 County Route 89 (Rockland County, New York)
 County Route 89 (Steuben County, New York)
 County Route 89 (Suffolk County, New York)
 North Carolina Highway 89
 North Dakota Highway 89
 Ohio State Route 89
 Oklahoma State Highway 89
 Pennsylvania Route 89
 South Dakota Highway 89
 Tennessee State Route 89
 Texas State Highway 89
 Farm to Market Road 89
Urban Road 89 (signed as Farm to Market Road 89)
 Utah State Route 89 (former)
 Virginia State Route 89
 West Virginia Route 89 (former)
 County Route 89 (Marshall County, West Virginia)
 County Route 89 (Wetzel County, West Virginia)
 Wisconsin Highway 89
 Wyoming Highway 89

See also
List of highways numbered 89A
A89